Ika-5 Utos (Lit: Fifth Commandment / English: Revenge) is a 2018 Philippine drama television series starring Jean Garcia, Valerie Concepcion and Gelli de Belen. The series premiered on GMA Network's GMA Afternoon Prime block and worldwide on GMA Pinoy TV from September 10, 2018 to February 8, 2019, replacing Contessa.

NUTAM (Nationwide Urban Television Audience Measurement) People in Television Homes ratings are provided by AGB Nielsen Philippines. 
The series ended, but its the 18th-week run, and with 116 episodes. It was replaced by Inagaw na Bituin.

Series overview

Episodes

September 2018

October 2018

November 2018

December 2018

January 2019

February 2019

References

Lists of Philippine drama television series episodes